is a private women's junior college in Tennōji-ku, Osaka, Japan, established in 1950.

External links
 Official website 

Educational institutions established in 1950
Private universities and colleges in Japan
Universities and colleges in Osaka Prefecture
Japanese junior colleges
Women's universities and colleges in Japan
1950 establishments in Japan